Rob Allan (born 1945, died 2021) was a New Zealand poet. He won the PEN (NZSA) Best First Book of Poetry award in 1992 for his book Karitane Postcards, and has received multiple grants from Creative New Zealand to support his writing. He has been published in several anthologies including An Anthology of New Zealand Poetry in English (Oxford University Press, 1997), and has published widely in literary magazines.

Personal life
Born in Birmingham, England, Allan moved to New Zealand with his family as a teenager in 1960. He lived in Port Chalmers, New Zealand, and worked as a teacher for deaf children in Otago schools.

Works
 Karitane Postcards (Hazard Press, 1991). .

References

External links
Three poems published in the Southern Ocean Review Ninth Issue, 12 October 1998
Southern Ocean Review 16th Issue, 12 July 2000
Rob Allan, capital of the minimal, New Zealand electronic poetry centre. Includes bio and links to several of Allan's poems.

New Zealand poets
New Zealand male poets
1945 births
Living people
People from Port Chalmers